Raí Souza Vieira de Oliveira (born 15 May 1965), known as Raí, is a Brazilian former professional footballer who played as an attacking midfielder.

He spent the better part of his 15-year career with São Paulo and Paris Saint-Germain, winning 10 major titles with the two teams combined, and nearing the 100-goal mark. He is considered by fans, journalists and players as the greatest legend of Paris Saint-Germain despite his relatively short period at the club. He is the younger brother of more famous Brazilian footballer Sócrates.

Raí played with Brazil for more than a decade, helping the country win the 1994 World Cup.

Club career

Early years
Born in Ribeirão Preto, São Paulo, Raí started his career with local Botafogo Futebol Clube (SP), signing in 1986 with Associação Atlética Ponte Preta, with which he made his Série A debuts.

São Paulo
Raí joined São Paulo FC for the 1987 season, only making his league debut on 18 October due to injury. He only scored once in his first year but, following the arrival of Telê Santana as coach, blossomed into a prolific scorer, scoring 28 overall in the 1991 campaign as the team won both the regional Campeonato Paulista and the National Championship.

In 1992, Raí was part of the São Paulo team that won the club's first ever Copa Libertadores, scoring the only goal of the final second-leg against Newell's Old Boys that took the match to a penalty shootout. Later that year, he was instrumental in the defeat of FC Barcelona in the 1992 Intercontinental Cup, netting both goals in a 2–1 win in Tokyo. This form saw Raí named South American Footballer of the Year for 1992.

In the 1993 season, São Paulo defended their Copa Libertadores title, with Raí again scoring in the final as CD Universidad Católica were beaten 5–1 at the Estádio do Morumbi.

Paris Saint-Germain

In June 1993, Raí was acquired by Paris Saint-Germain F.C. of France for US$4.6 million, remaining with São Paulo until the end of the year. He still managed to contribute with six goals in 28 Ligue 1 games as his new club won the national championship for the second time in its history; he helped PSG to the following season's French Cup, and was on target in the League Cup final against SC Bastia (2–0).

Raí once again proved essential as the capital outfit won the 1996 UEFA Cup Winners' Cup, scoring twice in a 3–1 home win against Parma, after a 1–0 away loss. He also appeared in the final against SK Rapid Wien, and went on to score three seasons in double digits during his five-season spell. In 1997–98 he scored in both the Coupe de la Ligue final and the Coupe de France final against Bordeaux and Lens respectively as PSG won both games.

Return to São Paulo
At the age of 33, Raí returned to São Paulo. He retired in 2000.

International career
Raí gained the first of his 49 caps for Brazil in 1987, whilst at São Paulo, being selected to that year's Copa América in Argentina, playing twice – including in the 0–4 group stage loss against Chile – in an eventual group stage exit. His debut occurred on 19 May at the Rous Cup, playing 15 minutes in a 1–1 draw against England.

Raí was picked by coach Carlos Alberto Parreira for his 1994 FIFA World Cup squad. He captained the team in the group stage and scored a penalty in the first match, a 2–0 win against Russia, after Romário was brought down in the box. Raí was subsequently dropped from the first team in the knockout stages, with Dunga taking over the captaincy. He was used as a substitute against the Netherlands (quarterfinals, ten minutes) and Sweden (semifinal, 45 minutes) as the national team went on to win the tournament.

Personal life
Raí's older brother, Sócrates, was also a footballer and an attacking midfielder. He too represented Botafogo de São Paulo in his career, and was also a longtime Brazilian international.

After retiring, Raí became a social activist and justice campaigner, being involved in two separate philanthropic organisations.

Career statistics

Club

International

Honours
São Paulo
 Campeonato Brasileiro Série A: 1991
 Campeonato Paulista (6): 1987, 1989, 1991, 1992, 1998, 2000
 Copa Libertadores: 1992, 1993
 Intercontinental Cup: 1992

Paris Saint-Germain
 Division 1: 1993–94
 Coupe de France: 1994–95, 1997–98
 Coupe de la Ligue: 1994–95, 1997–98
 Trophée des Champions: 1995
 UEFA Cup Winners' Cup: 1995–96; runner-up 1996–97
Brazil
 FIFA World Cup: 1994
 Copa América runner-up: 1991
Individual
 Bola de Prata: 1989
 Intercontinental Cup Most Valuable Player of the Match Award: 1992
 South American Footballer of the Year: 1992
 South American Team of the Year: 1992
IFFHS World's Best International Goal Scorer: 1992
 ESM Team of the Year: 1995–96
 Laureus Sport for Good Award: 2012
 Chevalier of the Légion d'honneur: 2013
 Honorary degree of the Paris Nanterre University: 2019

References

External links

 
 
 

1965 births
Living people
People from Ribeirão Preto
Brazilian footballers
Association football midfielders
Campeonato Brasileiro Série A players
Botafogo Futebol Clube (SP) players
Associação Atlética Ponte Preta players
São Paulo FC players
Ligue 1 players
Paris Saint-Germain F.C. players
Brazil international footballers
1987 Copa América players
1991 Copa América players
1994 FIFA World Cup players
Copa Libertadores-winning players
FIFA World Cup-winning players
Brazilian expatriate footballers
Expatriate footballers in France
South American Footballer of the Year winners
Pan American Games gold medalists for Brazil
Pan American Games medalists in football
Footballers at the 1987 Pan American Games
Chevaliers of the Légion d'honneur
Medalists at the 1987 Pan American Games
Brazilian expatriate sportspeople in France
Footballers from São Paulo (state)